Arguta is an unincorporated community in Dale County, Alabama, United States.

History
Arguta was named after Argura, North Carolina, an unincorporated community in Jackson County. A post office operated under the name Arguta from 1891 to 1906.

Demographics

Arguta Precinct (1910-50)

Arguta has never reported separately as an unincorporated community on the U.S. Census. However, the 5th precinct of Dale County was named for the community from 1910-1950. In 1960, the precinct was merged as part of a larger reorganization of counties into the census division of Ozark.

References

Unincorporated communities in Dale County, Alabama
Unincorporated communities in Alabama